The 2022 Superettan is part of the 2022 Swedish football season, and the 22nd season of Superettan, Sweden's second-tier football division in its current format. A total of 16 teams contest the league.

Teams
A total of 16 teams contest the league. The top three teams qualify directly for promotion to Allsvenskan, the fourth will enter a play-off for the chance of promotion. The three bottom teams are automatically relegated, while the 13th placef team will compete in a play-off to determine whether they are relegated.

New teams
Promoted from the 2021 Ettan
IF Brommapojkarna - Winner Ettan Norra
Utsiktens BK - Winner Ettan Södra
Dalkurd FF - Runner-up Ettan Norra — Promoted by winning play-off over GAIS
Skövde AIK - Runner-up Ettan Södra — Promoted by winning play-off over Akropolis IF

Relegated from the 2021 Allsvenskan
Östersunds FK
Örebro SK
Halmstads BK — Relegated by losing play-off to Helsingborgs IF

Stadiums and locations

League table

Relegation play-offs
The 13th-placed and 14th-placed teams of Superettan met the two runners-up from 2022 Division 1 (Norra and Södra) in two-legged ties on a home-and-away basis with the teams from Superettan finishing at home.

Örgryte IS won 4–3 on aggregate.

Positions by round

Placement Progression

Results by round

Results

Season statistics

Top scorers

Top assists

Hat-tricks

Notes
4 Player scored 4 goals(H) – Home team(A) – Away team

Discipline

Player 
Most yellow cards: 12 
 Karl Bohm (Utsikten)

Most red cards: 1
 Daniel Ask (Västerås SK)
 Niclas Bergmark (Örebro)
 Jesper Brandt (Utsikten)
 Abdelkarim Mammar Chaouche (Eskilstuna)
 Sebastian Crona (Jönköping)
 Fabio Dixon (Dalkurd)
 Erik Hedenquist (Landskrona)
 Koen Kostons (Dalkurd)
 Vladislav Kreida (Skövde)
 Jake Larsson (Örebro)
 Sigitas Olberkis (Dalkurd)
 Ivo Pękalski (Norrby)
 Nsima Peter (Utsikten)
 Jonathan Quintero (Utsikten)
 York Rafael (Eskilstuna)
 Pontus Rödin (Brage)

Club
 Most yellow cards: 36
 Östersund

 Most red cards: 3
 Dalkurd
 Utsikten

References

External links 

 Swedish Football Association – Superettan

Superettan seasons
2022 in Swedish association football leagues
Sweden
Sweden

Copied content from 2021 Superettan; see that page's history for attribution